Tula (also Kotule or Kitule) is one of the Savanna languages of Gombe State, northeastern Nigeria.

Dialects
Kleinewillinghöfer (2014) lists 3 Tula dialects.

Tula-Wange (Kutule) is possibly the oldest group. There are several hamlets located on the Tula Plateau. The people refer to themselves as Kɪtʊlɛ.
Tula-Baule, possibly former Chadic speakers who had shifted to Tula.
Tula-Yiri or Yili is the smallest and most divergent group.

References

Blench, Roger. 2012. Wordlist and analysis of Tula, and Adamawa language of NE Nigeria.

Waja languages
Languages of Nigeria